Ibrahima Diarra (born 16 February 1971) is a Burkinabé former professional footballer who played as a goalkeeper. He played in 33 matches for the Burkina Faso national team from 1992 to 2001. He was also named in Burkina Faso's squad for the 1998 African Cup of Nations tournament.

References

External links
 

1971 births
Living people
Burkinabé footballers
Association football goalkeepers
Burkina Faso international footballers
1996 African Cup of Nations players
1998 African Cup of Nations players
Fath Union Sport players
Burkinabé expatriate footballers
Burkinabé expatriate sportspeople in Morocco
Expatriate footballers in Morocco
Place of birth missing (living people)
21st-century Burkinabé people